The FBI Files is an American television docudrama series that originally ran from 1998 to 2006 on the Discovery Channel and produced by New Dominion Pictures. The show was cancelled in 2006. However, Court TV Mystery, Discovery, and its sister network, Investigation Discovery, aired re-runs until October 2012. Investigation Discovery only showed episodes from seasons 5,6, and 7. As of October 2012, the network now airs episodes from the earlier seasons (although not necessarily in chronological order), with updated information about the cases at the end of most episodes. Up to late September 2012, WE tv showed episodes from seasons 1-4, but the network had removed the episode introductions by Jim Kallstrom. In the UK on Quest Red, The FBI Files airs every weeknight. It has also been shown on TV Denmark, Discovery Australia, and Netflix in Canada. 

More recently, New Dominion Pictures made all episodes of The FBI Files available on YouTube.

Synopsis
The show described actual FBI cases, with dramatic reenactments and interviews with agents and forensic scientists who worked in the investigations. The show premiered on October 20, 1998, and 120 episodes were executive produced by Tom Naughton before the final original episode shown on March 24, 2006. The series covered the kidnapping and murder of Polly Klaas, the investigation and conviction of John Gotti, the Unabomber case, the World Trade Center Bombing, the Sara Tokars murder case, the several prison escapes by Christopher Jeburk, John Birges's biggest bomb in history (Harvey's Casino in Stateline, Nevada), and many other well-known and less well-known true crime stories. Unlike The New Detectives, a somewhat similar true crime show, The FBI Files centers on murders, narcotics, bank robberies, kidnappings, etc., where the FBI is called in to assist police departments.

Hosts and narrators
James Kallstrom, a former head of the FBI's New York City office, hosted the show. Among other high-profile cases, he investigated the crash of TWA Flight 800. Allison Erkelens was head writer for the series' production company, New Dominion Pictures, from 2000 to 2005.

Anthony Call, an actor known for roles on the daytime soap operas The Guiding Light and One Life to Live, co-hosted/narrates all the United States episodes and some international ones. Susan Rae and Stephen Kemble were the narrators on several international versions of the show.

Lucy Longhurst narrated the international version of the episodes "Murdering Cowboy" that was about the convicted felon Claude Dallas and "Deadly Paradise" about the "Sea Wind Murders" on Palmyra Atoll.

Peter Dickson narrated season 2 of the international version of the show. Among those were the episodes "A Model Killer" that was about the slain serial killer Christopher Wilder (aka- "The Beauty Queen Killer") and "Cat and Mouse" about the 1985 search for South Carolina's convicted serial killer Larry Gene Bell.

Among those Susan Rae did was "Dishonoured" about the 1989 disappearance of USMC Capt. Shirley Russell, and the joint FBI – NIS investigation of her husband, former USMC Capt. Robert Russell and "When Seconds Count" about when a 12-year-old girl was abducted from her home in Lodi, California.

Among those Stephen Kemble did was "The Price of Greed" about the 1997 Los Angeles Dunbar Armored robbery.

Among those international versions Call did was "Omega 7" about the Omega 7 group and "Dangerous Cause" about the Fuerzas Armadas de Liberación Nacional Puertorriqueña group.
 
Ben Ando also did some voice overs in the UK.

Episodes

Home media
Timeless Media Group has released the first four seasons of The FBI Files on DVD in Region 1.

See also
Forensic Detectives
The New Detectives

References

External links
 
 http://www.tv.com/people/anthony-call/ 

1998 American television series debuts
2006 American television series endings
1990s American documentary television series
2000s American documentary television series
American crime television series
Discovery Channel original programming
1990s American crime television series
2000s American crime television series
True crime television series
Television series featuring reenactments
Federal Bureau of Investigation
Television series by New Dominion Pictures